U.S. Bank Tower may refer to:
U.S. Bank Tower (Los Angeles), a  skyscraper in downtown Los Angeles, California, the third tallest building in California
 U.S. Bank Tower (Sacramento), a 25-story,  building in Sacramento, California

See also
 U.S. Bank Plaza (disambiguation)
 U.S. Bank Center (disambiguation)
 U.S. Bancorp Tower